Poggio Casalino is a village (curazia) located in San Marino. It belongs to the municipality (castello) of Chiesanuova.

Geography
The village is situated in the western border of its municipality, close to the borders with Italy and the municipality of San Leo. It lies on a road that links the city of San Marino with the rural area of San Leo and some of its civil parishes.

See also
Chiesanuova
Caladino
Confine
Galavotto
Molarini
Poggio Chiesanuova
Teglio

Curazie in San Marino
Italy–San Marino border crossings
Chiesanuova